Staithes is a seaside village in the borough of Scarborough in North Yorkshire, England. Easington and Roxby Becks, two brooks that run into Staithes Beck, form the border between the Borough of Scarborough and Redcar and Cleveland. The area located on the Redcar and Cleveland side is called Cowbar. Formerly one of the many fishing centres in England, Staithes is now largely a tourist destination within the North York Moors National Park.

History
The name Staithes derives from Old English and means 'landing-place'. It has been suggested that it is so named after being the port for the nearby Seaton Hall and Hinderwell.  The spelling Steeas is sometimes used to indicate the traditional local dialect pronunciation .

At the turn of the 20th century, there were 80 full-time fishing boats putting out from Staithes. A hundred years later there are still a few part-time fisher men. There is a long tradition of using the coble (a traditional fishing vessel) in Staithes.
 
Staithes has numerous narrow streets and passageways; one of these, Dog Loup, with a width of just ,  is claimed to be the narrowest alley in the world.
It was reported in 1997 that the Royal Mail were encouraging the occupants of Staithes to number their houses instead of relying on names. Whilst the regular postperson had no difficulty with the narrow streets and cottages, the relief postal staff were getting confused. Royal Mail also claimed it would aid efficiency by their postal machines which automatically read the addresses.

Geography 
Staithes has a sheltered harbour, bounded by high cliffs and two long breakwaters.
A mile to the west is Boulby Cliff where, for a brief period, alum was extracted from quarried shale and used as a mordant to improve the strength and permanency of colour when dying cloth.
The mining operation ended when a cheaper chemical method was developed. The ruined remnants of the mines can be seen from the cliff top when walking the Cleveland Way between Staithes and Skinningrove.

Geology 
Staithes is a destination for geologists researching the Jurassic (Lias), strata in the cliffs surrounding the village. In the early 1990s, a rare fossil of a seagoing dinosaur was discovered after a rockfall between Staithes and Port Mulgrave to the south. This fossil has been the focus of an ongoing project to remove the ancient bones of the creature. Port Mulgrave remains one of the best places on the northern coast to find fossils of ammonites and many visitors spend hours cracking open the shaly rocks on the shoreline in the hope of finding a perfect specimen.

Churches 
The parish church is St Peter, Staithes.
The Roman Catholic church of Our Lady, Star of the Sea was built in 1885.

Transport 
Between 1883 and 1958, the village was served by Staithes railway station which was on the Whitby, Redcar and Middlesbrough Union Railway. The southern end of the village is bisected by the A174 road between Thornaby-on-Tees and Whitby.

Culture and events 
The permanent population of the village has dwindled due to more than half of the houses being second homes or holiday cottages. This has led to the erosion of Staithes' old culture, although a tradition for making fishing bonnets continues  and the local fishermens' choir continues to perform. There is active local participation in the local RNLI Lifeboat station and crew. Locally, the name was traditionally pronounced "Steers".

To celebrate its place in art history, Staithes held a festival of arts and heritage in 2012. Many houses and other properties opened their doors to the public as pop-up galleries, creating a trail through the village. In addition, events celebrating the heritage of Staithes were held. Such was the success and interest in the festival, the villagers intend to make this an annual event.

There is a local pub crawl known as the "Roxby Run". This starts at the "Fox and Hounds" in the nearby village of Dalehouse then goes to Staithes Athletic Club, the "Captain Cook Inn", the "Black Lion" (now closed) the "Royal George" before finishing at the "Cod and Lobster" on the harbour.

Staithes in popular culture 
The CBeebies series Old Jack's Boat, starring Bernard Cribbins, is set in and filmed in Staithes, with Old Jack's house located at 4 Cowbar Bank in the town.

The 2017 film Phantom Thread starring Daniel Day-Lewis features the cobbled streets of Staithes.

Sport 
Staithes Athletic Club Cricket Club ground is situated off Seaton Crescent, Staithes. The club have two senior teams: a Saturday 1st XI that compete in the Scarborough Beckett Cricket League, a Midweek Senior XI in the Esk Valley Evening League and a junior section that compete in the Derwent Valley Junior Cricket League.

Notable people 
In 1745–46, Staithes' most famous resident, James Cook (born in Marton-in-Cleveland, Middlesbrough), worked in Staithes as a grocer's apprentice where he first gained his passion for the sea. He moved to nearby Whitby where he joined the Royal Navy. William Sanderson's shop, where Cook worked, was destroyed by the sea, but parts were recovered and incorporated into "Captain Cook's Cottage". This has been the residency of a local Staithes family for several generations.

Artists 
The village was home to a group of twenty to thirty artists known as the "Staithes group" or the "Northern Impressionists". The group contained renowned artists such as Edward E. Anderson, Joseph R. Bagshawe, Thomas Barrett and James W. Booth and was inspired by other impressionists such as Monet, Cézanne and Renoir. Dame Laura Knight became the most famous member of the Staithes Group; she and her husband and fellow painter Harold Knight kept a studio in the village.

See also
Staithe

References

External links 

Staithes Town web site
The Haunting of Staithes Bay
.

Villages in North Yorkshire
Populated coastal places in North Yorkshire
Fishing communities in England
Borough of Scarborough